Magnetic 3D bioprinting is a methodology that employs biocompatible magnetic nanoparticles to print cells into 3D structures or 3D cell cultures. In this process, cells are tagged with magnetic nanoparticles (nanoshuttle) that are used to render them magnetic. Once magnetic, these cells can be rapidly printed into specific 3D patterns using external magnetic forces that mimic tissue structure and function.

General principle
There are several advantages to using magnetic 3D bioprinting over other 3D printing modalities such as extrusion, photolithography, and stereolithography. This includes the rapid bioprinting process (15 min – 1 h) compared to the days-long processes of others; the endogenous synthesis of extracellular matrix (ECM) without the need of an artificial protein substrate; and fine spatial control. Using this system, 3D cell culture models can be rapidly printed, from simple spheroids and rings to more complex organotypic models, such as the lung, aortic valve, and white fat.

History
The first commercially available 3D bioprinting system is being commercialized by Nano3D Biosciences, Inc. The first application of this system is for high-throughput and high-content drug screening.

Process
The cells first need to be incubated in the presence of magnetic nanoparticles to make them more susceptible to manipulation through magnetic fields. The system developed by Nano3D Biosciences uses a "nanoshuttle" which is a nanoparticle assembly consisting of gold, magnetic iron oxide, and poly-L-lysine which assists in adhesion to the cell membrane via electrostatic interactions. In this system, cells are magnetically printed into 3D patterns (rings or dots) using fields generated by permanent magnets. The cells within the printed construct interact with surrounding cells and the ECM to migrate, proliferate, and ultimately shrink the structure, typically within 24 hours.

When used as a toxicity assay, this shrinkage varies with drug concentration and is a label-free metric of cell function that can be easily captured and measured with brightfield imaging. In the system developed by Nano3D Biosciences, the size of the pattern can be captured using an iPod-based system, which is programmed using a freely available app (Experimental Assistant) to image whole plates of up to 96 structures at small intervals (as small as 1 s) to efficiently capture pharmacodynamics.

Diamagnetophoresis

Cells can be assembled without using magnetic nanoparticles by employing diamagnetism.  Some materials are strongly attracted, or susceptible, to magnets than others. Materials with higher magnetic susceptibility will experience stronger attraction to a magnet and move towards it. The weakly attracted material with lower susceptibility is displaced to lower magnetic field regions that lie away from the magnet. By designing magnetic fields and carefully arranged magnets, it is possible to use the differences in the magnetic susceptibilities of two materials to concentrate only one within a volume.

An example is to be found in the work where a bioink was formulated by suspending human breast cancer cells in a cell culture medium that contained the paramagnetic salt, diethylenetriaminepentaacetic acid gadolinium (III) dihydrogen salt hydrate (Gd-DTPA). Like most cells, these breast cancer cells are much more weakly attracted by magnets than Gd-DTPA, which is an FDA-approved MRI contrast agent for use in humans. Therefore, when a magnetic field was applied, the salt hydrate moved towards the magnets, displacing the cells to a predetermined area of minimum magnetic field strength, which seeded the formation of a 3D cell cluster.

Application
Magnetic 3D bioprinting can be used to screen for cardiovascular toxicity, which accounts for 30% of drug withdrawals.  Vascular smooth muscle cells are magnetically printed into 3D rings to mimic blood vessels that can contract and dilate. This system could potentially replace experiments using ex vivo tissue, which are costly and yield few data per experiment. Furthermore, magnetic 3D bioprinting can use human cells to approximate a human in vivo response better than with an animal model. This has been demonstrated by the bioassay which combines the benefits of 3D bioprinting in building tissue-like structures for study with the speed of magnetic printing.

Users
The target users for magnetic 3D bioprinting are in the pharmaceutical and CRO industries, where this system can be integrated early in the drug discovery process as a compound screen for toxicity and efficacy. In the future, magnetic 3D bioprinting could be applied to the field of regenerative medicine and organogenesis.

See also 
Bio-printing
Organovo

References

Further reading 

 
 

Nanotechnology